Jaruwat Cheawaram, also known as Dome (born on 29 September 1991 in Phuket, Thailand), is a Thai singer. The champion of The Star Season 8, Thailand's famous singing contest, he is known for his songs "Kham Athitthan Duai Nam Ta" (คำอธิษฐานด้วยน้ำตา) and "Rak Tae Yu Nuea Kanwela" (รักแท้อยู่เหนือกาลเวลา) and his leading role as "Tun" (ตุ่น) in the sitcom, "Gene-Den (The Dominant Man)" (ยีนเด่น).

Profile 

Born on 29 September 1991 in Pathum Thani, Thailand, he had a passion for singing since he was a child. His family was poor with his father suffering from paralysis due to cerebral hemorrhage from an accident.

When he was 16, Jaruwat joined The Star Season 4 and 5 but was eliminated. He was then inspired by the winner, eighteen-year-old Wichayanee Pearklin or "Gam". He was back again in The Star Season 8 and making it to the final round, held at Impact Arena in Muang Thong Thani on 29 April, with fellow contestant Tanatat Kangsomm Chaiyaat. After the finale, where all the year's contestants sang together, the result was announced. Jaruwat "Dome" Cheawaram received the highest votes from viewers all over the country. Dome is now Thailand's 8th Star, and will be signing a contract with GMM Grammy and continue to build his career in the entertainment industry.

References 

1991 births
Living people
Jaruwat Cheawaram
Jaruwat Cheawaram
Jaruwat Cheawaram
Jaruwat Cheawaram
Jaruwat Cheawaram
Jaruwat Cheawaram